The IWRG Intercontinental Trios Championship (Campeon Intercontinental Trios de IWRG in Spanish) is a Trios (six-man) tag team Championship promoted by the Mexican Lucha libre professional wrestling promotion International Wrestling Revolution Group (IWRG) and was introduced in 2000. As it is a professional wrestling championship, the championship was not won not by actual competition, but by a scripted ending to a match determined by the bookers and match makers. On occasion the promotion declares a championship vacant, which means there is no champion at that point in time. This can either be due to a storyline, or real life issues such as a champion suffering an injury being unable to defend the championship, or leaving the company.

The championship was first won by Escuadrón de la Muerte (Spanish for "the Squadron of Death"; Maniac Cop, Vader Cop and Cyborg Cop) as they defeated the team of Oficial, Vigilante and Guardian in Naucalpan, Mexico on November 11, 1999. The title has primarily been defended in Naucalpan since its inception as it is the "home" of IWRG. Los Piratas (Pirata Morgan, Pirata Morgan Jr. and El Hijo de Pirata Morgan) is the only trio to have held the title twice, Cerebro Negro and Veneno are the only other wrestlers have held the title twice but with different partners. The trio of Los Poderosos (Hombre Sin Miedo, Kendor Jr. and Sobredosis) held the title for seven days, the shortest reign of any championship trio. Espartaco, Latino and Tempestad are the current Trios champions, having won the championship in a match against La Dinastía de la Muerte  ("The Dynasty of Death"; Negro Navarro, Trauma I and Trauma II) on July 3, 2022 in Saltillo, Coahuila. They are the 21st overall Trios champions and the 19th trio to hold the championship.

Title history

Combined reigns

By wrestler

Footnotes

References

External links
wrestling-titles.com
Solie.org
cagematch.net

International Wrestling Revolution Group championships
Trios wrestling tag team championships
Intercontinental professional wrestling championships